Joseph E. Mann (born 1955) is a former two-term member of the Connecticut House of Representatives from Norwalk, Connecticut's 140th assembly district. He served in the Connecticut House from 2003 to 2007. He also served nine years on the Norwalk Common Council, including as its president. He currently serves on the board of Norwalk Economic Opportunity Now.

Early life and family 
Mann is the eldest of five children of Leslie and Harriet Mann. He was born in North Carolina, and moved to Norwalk in 1958 at the age of three. He attended Norwalk public schools, graduating from Brien McMahon High School in 1973. He attended Bethune-Cookman College, where he majored in business administration and was a member of the Omega Psi Phi fraternity. In 1996, he graduated from the Hartford Seminary.

Political career 
Mann was elected to the Connecticut House in a three way race against Republican Richard McQuaid and petition candidate Donnie Sellers, who was a Democrat who had once held the seat. He was elected to the Connecticut House in November 2002, and took office on January 8, 2003.

He served on the Human Services Committee, the Higher Education and Employment Advancement Committee and as Vice-Chair of the Select Committee on Housing.

Other public offices 
 Member, Norwalk Democratic Town & City Committee, 
 Member, Second Taxing District Charter Revision Committee
 Member, Mid-Fairfield Substance Abuse Coalition
 Commissioner & Vice Chair of the Second Taxing District Electric Commission

Associations 
 President & CEO, Norwalk Economic Opportunity Now, Inc.
 Member, YMCA of Norwalk Board of Trustees
 Member, Norwalk Hospital Board of Trustees
 Chair, Norwalk Community Health Center Board of Trustees
 Member, Norwalk Maritime Aquarium Board of Trustees
 Justice of the Peace
 Member, New Light Missionary Baptist Church
 Treasurer, Norwalk Branch NAACP
 Keeper  of Finance, Alpha Nu Chapter, Omega Psi Phi fraternity

Awards and honors 
 Distinguished Service and Superior Service Award from the Alpha Nu Chapter of Omega Psi Phi fraternity
 Omega Man of the Year for 2010
 Man of the Year Recognition from the G. W. Carver Youth Development Program
 Award for Outstanding Advocacy from the Mid-Fairfield Child Guidance Center
 Recognition for Outstanding Legislative Leadership from the Connecticut Community Providers Association
 Thurgood Marshal Community Service Award from Quinnipiac University's Black Law School Student's Association
 Community Service Award from the Parent Leadership Training Institute (PLTI)
 Reverend J. P. Ball Award for Leadership from the Norwalk Branch of the NAACP
 Named one of the 100 Most Influential Blacks in the State of Connecticut by the Connecticut State Conference of NAACP Branches in 2009 and 2011.

References 

1955 births
African-American state legislators in Connecticut
Baptist ministers from the United States
Bethune–Cookman University alumni
Connecticut city council members
Hartford Seminary alumni
Living people
Democratic Party members of the Connecticut House of Representatives
Politicians from Norwalk, Connecticut
People from North Carolina
21st-century African-American people
20th-century African-American people